Counterexamples in Topology (1970, 2nd ed. 1978) is a book on mathematics by topologists Lynn Steen and J. Arthur Seebach, Jr.

In the process of working on problems like the metrization problem, topologists (including Steen and Seebach) have defined a wide variety of topological properties.  It is often useful in the study and understanding of abstracts such as topological spaces to determine that one property does not follow from another.  One of the easiest ways of doing this is to find a counterexample which exhibits one property but not the other.  In Counterexamples in Topology, Steen and Seebach, together with five students in an undergraduate research project at St. Olaf College, Minnesota in the summer of 1967, canvassed the field of topology for such counterexamples and compiled them in an attempt to simplify the literature.

For instance, an example of a first-countable space which is not second-countable is counterexample #3, the discrete topology on an uncountable set.  This particular counterexample shows that second-countability does not follow from first-countability.

Several other "Counterexamples in ..." books and papers have followed, with similar motivations.

Reviews
In her review of the first edition, Mary Ellen Rudin wrote:
In other mathematical fields one restricts one's problem by requiring that the space be Hausdorff or paracompact or metric, and usually one doesn't really care which, so long as the restriction is strong enough to avoid  this dense forest of counterexamples. A usable map of the forest is a fine thing...
In his submission to Mathematical Reviews C. Wayne Patty wrote:
...the book is extremely useful, and the general topology student will no doubt find it very valuable. In addition it is very well written.
When the second edition appeared in 1978 its review in Advances in Mathematics treated topology as territory to be explored:
Lebesgue once said that every mathematician should be something of a naturalist.  This book, the updated journal of a continuing expedition to the never-never land of general topology, should appeal to the latent naturalist in every mathematician.

Notation
Several of the naming conventions in this book differ from more accepted modern conventions, particularly with respect to the separation axioms. The authors use the terms T3, T4, and T5 to refer to regular, normal, and completely normal. They also refer to  completely Hausdorff as Urysohn. This was a result of the different historical development of metrization theory and general topology; see History of the separation axioms for more.

The long line in example 45 is what most topologists nowadays would call the 'closed long ray'.

List of mentioned counterexamples

Finite discrete topology
Countable discrete topology
Uncountable discrete topology
Indiscrete topology
Partition topology
Odd–even topology
Deleted integer topology
Finite particular point topology
Countable particular point topology
Uncountable particular point topology
Sierpiński space, see also particular point topology
Closed extension topology
Finite excluded point topology
Countable excluded point topology
Uncountable excluded point topology
Open extension topology
Either-or topology
Finite complement topology on a countable space
Finite complement topology on an uncountable space
Countable complement topology
Double pointed countable complement topology
Compact complement topology
Countable Fort space
Uncountable Fort space
Fortissimo space
Arens–Fort space
Modified Fort space
Euclidean topology
Cantor set
Rational numbers
Irrational numbers
Special subsets of the real line
Special subsets of the plane
One point compactification topology
One point compactification of the rationals
Hilbert space
Fréchet space
Hilbert cube
Order topology
Open ordinal space [0,Γ) where Γ<Ω
Closed ordinal space [0,Γ] where Γ<Ω
Open ordinal space [0,Ω)
Closed ordinal space [0,Ω]
Uncountable discrete ordinal space
Long line
Extended long line
An altered long line
Lexicographic order topology on the unit square
Right order topology
Right order topology on R
Right half-open interval topology
Nested interval topology
Overlapping interval topology
Interlocking interval topology
Hjalmar Ekdal topology, whose name was introduced in this book.
Prime ideal topology
Divisor topology
Evenly spaced integer topology
The p-adic topology on Z
Relatively prime integer topology
Prime integer topology
Double pointed reals
Countable complement extension topology
Smirnov's deleted sequence topology
Rational sequence topology
Indiscrete rational extension of R
Indiscrete irrational extension of R
Pointed rational extension of R
Pointed irrational extension of R
Discrete rational extension of R
Discrete irrational extension of R
Rational extension in the plane
Telophase topology
Double origin topology
 Irrational slope topology
Deleted diameter topology
Deleted radius topology
Half-disk topology
Irregular lattice topology
Arens square
Simplified Arens square
Niemytzki's tangent disk topology
Metrizable tangent disk topology
Sorgenfrey's half-open square topology
Michael's product topology
Tychonoff plank
Deleted Tychonoff plank
Alexandroff plank
Dieudonné plank
Tychonoff corkscrew
Deleted Tychonoff corkscrew
Hewitt's condensed corkscrew
Thomas's plank
Thomas's corkscrew
Weak parallel line topology
Strong parallel line topology
Concentric circles
Appert space
Maximal compact topology
Minimal Hausdorff topology
Alexandroff square
ZZ
Uncountable products of Z+
Baire product metric on Rω
II
[0,Ω)×II
Helly space
C[0,1]
Box product topology on Rω
Stone–Čech compactification
Stone–Čech compactification of the integers
Novak space
Strong ultrafilter topology
Single ultrafilter topology
Nested rectangles
Topologist's sine curve
Closed topologist's sine curve
Extended topologist's sine curve
Infinite broom
Closed infinite broom
Integer broom
Nested angles
Infinite cage
Bernstein's connected sets
Gustin's sequence space
Roy's lattice space
Roy's lattice subspace
Cantor's leaky tent
Cantor's teepee
Pseudo-arc
Miller's biconnected set
Wheel without its hub
Tangora's connected space
Bounded metrics
Sierpinski's metric space
Duncan's space
Cauchy completion
Hausdorff's metric topology
Post Office metric
Radial metric
Radial interval topology
Bing's discrete extension space
Michael's closed subspace

See also

References

  
  
Lynn Arthur Steen and J. Arthur Seebach, Jr., Counterexamples in Topology. Springer-Verlag, New York, 1978. Reprinted by Dover Publications, New York, 1995.  (Dover edition).

External links

 π-Base: An Interactive Encyclopedia of Topological Spaces

1978 non-fiction books
General topology
Mathematics books